Niveaphasma annulata is a species of stick insect found in New Zealand.

It is the sole member of the genus Niveaphasma which is unique among stick insects because it can be found living in alpine areas.

Distribution and habitat 
Niveaphasma annulata is restricted to the southern half of the South Island. It is absent from the North Island and has not been observed north of Arthur's Pass.

References 

Phasmatodea
Phasmatodea genera
Monotypic insect genera
Phasmatidae of New Zealand